Fosen District Court was a district court in Trøndelag county, Norway. The court was based at the Fosen Tinghus in the town of Brekstad in the municipality of Ørland. The court existed from 1591 until 2021. It had jurisdiction over the municipalities of Ørland, Bjugn, Frøya, Hitra, Indre Fosen, Osen, Roan, and Åfjord. Cases from this court could be appealed to Frostating Court of Appeal. The court was last led by the acting chief judge Leif Otto Østerbø. This court employed a chief judge, two other judges, and several prosecutors and administrators.

The court was a court of first instance. Its judicial duties were mainly to settle criminal cases and to resolve civil litigation as well as bankruptcy. The administration and registration tasks of the court included death registration, issuing certain certificates, performing duties of a notary public, and officiating civil wedding ceremonies. Cases from this court were heard by a combination of professional judges and lay judges.

History
This court was established in 1591 when district courts were originally established in Norway. On 26 April 2021, the court was merged with the Namdal District Court, Inntrøndelag District Court, and Sør-Trøndelag District Court to create the new Trøndelag District Court.

References

Defunct district courts of Norway
Organisations based in Brekstad
1591 establishments in Norway
Courts and tribunals established in 1591
2021 disestablishments in Norway